Thomas Vana (born 9 October 1972) is a German former footballer who played as a defensive midfielder. He played for SSVg Velbert and Bayer 04 Leverkusen before joining MSV Duisburg in 1995, where he made 120 league appearances and scored 9 goals. He also played in the 1998 DFB-Pokal Final for Duisburg, where they lost 2–1 to FC Bayern Munich.

References

Living people
1972 births
German footballers
Association football midfielders
SSVg Velbert players
Bayer 04 Leverkusen players
MSV Duisburg players
Bundesliga players
2. Bundesliga players
West German footballers